Jocelyn Louise Burdick (née Birch; February 6, 1922 – December 26, 2019) was an American politician from North Dakota who briefly served as a Democratic United States senator during 1992. She was the first woman from the state to hold this office. At the age of 97, she was the oldest living former U.S. Senator for the last eight months of her life.

Early life and education 
Burdick was born in Fargo, North Dakota, the daughter of Magdalena Towers (Carpenter) and Albert Birch. Her great-grandmother was suffragist and abolitionist Matilda Joslyn Gage. Burdick was the great-niece, by marriage, of L. Frank Baum, the author of The Wizard of Oz, who was married to her great-aunt, activist Maud Gage Baum. She was educated at Principia College and at Northwestern University.

Early career 
After graduating from Northwestern, Burdick returned to Fargo working as a radio announcer at KVOX radio. Burdick was engaged in civics throughout her marriage to Quentin Burdick. She was  part of the official U.S. delegation to Russia in 1978 and she was a  trustee to the Lake Agassiz Arts Council. Burdick helped to found the Democratic Women Plus in the early 1980s. She also recorded public service announcements against drunk driving and drug use in 1989.

U.S. Senate
Upon the death of her husband Senator Quentin N. Burdick in September 1992, Jocelyn Burdick was appointed by Governor George Sinner to fill the vacancy in his position until a special election was held. She did not run as a candidate for election to the rest of the term. During her brief tenure in office, Burdick supported legislation on pay equity and women's rights. After Kent Conrad took office in December 1992, Burdick retired to Fargo.

Burdick was the first woman from North Dakota to serve in either house of the U.S. Congress. She lived in Fargo, where she remained active in politics. She was the oldest living former U.S. Senator on April 6, 2019, following the death of Fritz Hollings.

Personal life
Burdick was a devout Christian Scientist. Burdick's first husband was Kenneth Peterson. She had two children with Peterson. Peterson died in 1958 of a heart attack. Two years later she married Quentin Burdick. With Quentin she had another son, Gage. Gage died in 1978 from an accident with an electric belt sander. Burdick died in Fargo on December 26, 2019, at the age of 97.

See also 
 Women in the United States Senate

References

External links 
 US Government. Women in Congress. US Government, 1976.
 
 

|-

1922 births
2019 deaths
Politicians from Fargo, North Dakota
Burdick family
Democratic Party United States senators from North Dakota
Female United States senators
Spouses of North Dakota politicians
Women in North Dakota politics
20th-century American politicians
20th-century American women politicians
Principia College alumni
Northwestern University alumni